Isolation Party is an album by the American musician Tommy Keene. It was released in 1998 by Matador Records. It includes a cover version of Mission of Burma's "Einstein's Day".

Critical reception
Entertainment Weekly concluded that "power-pop enthusiasts should find plenty to admire in these melodically acute tunes, although true highlights are in short supply." The Chicago Tribune praised the "ringing, buoyant guitar lines, sing-along choruses, thoughtful lyrics and a touch of melancholy that never grows depressed but keeps things from ever getting giddy."

AllMusic wrote that the album is "a harder and leaner set than he usually offered up in his earlier days ... though the hallmarks of his style—moody but graceful melodies, a nimble and efficient rhythm section, and Keene's passionate vocals and subtly sublime guitar work—are still very much in evidence."

Track listing
All songs written by Tommy Keene, except where noted
"Long Time Missing" – 4:38
"Getting Out From Under You" – 3:19
"Take Me Back" – 4:44
"Never Really Been Gone" – 3:29
"The World Outside" – 3:21
"Einstein's Day" – 4:43 (Roger Miller)
Originally recorded by Mission of Burma, 1982
"Battle Lines" – 5:11
"Happy When You're Sad	" – 3:31
"Love Dies Down" – 3:44
"Tuesday Morning" – 2:37
"Waiting Without You" – 3:55
"Weak And Watered Down" – 4:15
"Twilight's In Town" – 3:38

Personnel

The band
Tommy Keene — Guitar, back-up vocals
John Richardson — Drums, percussion

Additional musicians
Jay Bennett — Organ, acoustic and electric guitar, bass guitar
Leroy Bocchieri — Bass guitar
Tom Broeske — Bass guitar
Jeff Murphy — Back-up vocals
Jeff Tweedy — Back-up vocals
Jesse Valenzuela — Back-up vocals

Production
Jay Bennett — Engineer, production assistant, editing, mastering, mixing, assistant producer
Brendan Gamble — Engineer
Jeff Murphy — Engineer
Jonathan Pines — Engineer, production assistant, editing, mastering, mixing, assistant producer
Adam Schmitt — Editing, mastering

References

1998 albums
Tommy Keene albums